Hermanus "Herman" Nicolaas van Leeuwen (8 June 1884, in Amsterdam – February 7, 1926, in Amsterdam) was a Dutch gymnast and high jumper who competed in the 1908 Summer Olympics. He was part of the Dutch gymnastics team, which finished seventh in the team event. In the individual all-around competition he finished 95th.

He also participated in the high jump competition and finished 19th.

References

External links
 

1884 births
1926 deaths
Dutch male artistic gymnasts
Dutch male high jumpers
Olympic athletes of the Netherlands
Gymnasts at the 1908 Summer Olympics
Athletes (track and field) at the 1908 Summer Olympics
Sportspeople from Amsterdam
Olympic male high jumpers